The Lotus 93T was a Formula One car with which the Team Lotus participated the first part of the F1 championship in 1983. It was the first Lotus car to use the Renault Gordini EF1 turbo engine and was the last F1 car designed by team founder Colin Chapman. In the championship the car was driven by Elio de Angelis, the other driver of the team, Nigel Mansell, raced with the Lotus 92, a car with the Ford Cosworth engine. The 93T was replaced in the course of the season with the Lotus 94T. Mansell drove the 93T car twice, in the 1983 German Grand Prix after he suffered problems with his 94T during the warm-up and had to revert to the older model and in a non-championship race, the 1983 Race of Champions. The 93T usually performed well in qualifying but suffered with reliability problems and came only once to the finish of a race.

Its design and development is the subject of the documentary Lotus Goes Turbo which follows the team's steps through the introduction of the new Renault engine to replace the naturally aspirated Cosworth power plant.

Complete Formula One World Championship results
(key)

* All points scored using the Lotus 94T. Lotus-Renault placed 8th in the Constructors' Championship with 11 points. In addition, Lotus-Ford scored 1 point to place 13th in the Championship.

References

1983 Formula One season cars
93T